Horizons is a centre-right political party in France founded in October 2021 by Édouard Philippe, at the time mayor of Le Havre and ex-Prime Minister of France. 

The party was created with the purpose of attracting centre-right support for Emmanuel Macron for the 2022 French presidential election. Ahead of the 2022 legislative election, it formed a coalition with two other main centrist parties – Democratic Movement (MoDem) and La République En Marche! (LREM) – to coordinate which candidates it presents.

Notable members

Members of Parliament 
Elected in the 2022 French legislative election:

Mayors and MEPs 
 Arnaud Robinet, mayor of Reims
 Édouard Philippe, mayor of Le Havre
 Hubert Falco, mayor of Toulon
 Christian Estrosi, mayor of Nice
 Christophe Béchu, mayor of Angers
 Delphine Bürkli, mayor of the 9th arrondissement of Paris
 Gilles Boyer, member of the European Parliament
 Laurent Marcangeli, mayor of Ajaccio

Electoral results

National Assembly

References

External links
 

Centre-right parties in Europe
Political parties established in 2021
2021 establishments in France